The 1970–71 Challenge Cup was the 70th staging of rugby league's oldest knockout competition, the Challenge Cup.

The final was contested by Leeds and Leigh at Wembley.

First round

Second round

Quarter-finals

Semi-finals

Final
The final was played on Saturday 15 May 1971, where Leigh beat Leeds 24-7 at Wembley in front of a crowd of 85,514.

The winner of the Lance Todd Trophy was Leigh's captain-coach, Alex Murphy who was stretchered off after a clash with Leeds player, Syd Hynes. For his part in the "clash", Hynes was sent off, and became the first player to be sent-off in a Challenge Cup final after the headbutt on Leigh's Murphy.

This was Leigh's second Cup final win in two final appearances. To date it was also their last appearance in a Challenge Cup final.

References

External links
Challenge Cup official website 
Challenge Cup 1970/71 results at Rugby League Project

Challenge Cup
Challenge Cup